Slovakia competed at the 2020 Summer Olympics in Tokyo. Originally scheduled to take place from 24 July to 9 August 2020, the Games were postponed to 23 July to 8 August 2021, due to the COVID-19 pandemic. It was the nation's seventh consecutive appearance at the Summer Olympics after gaining its independence from the former Czechoslovakia.

Medalists

| width=78% align=left valign=top |

| width=22% align=left valign=top |

Competitors

| width=78% align=left valign=top |
The following is the list of number of competitors in the Games.

| width=22% align=left valign=top |

Archery

One Slovak archer booked an Olympic place in the women's individual recurve by finishing in the top four at the 2021 European Championships in Antalya, Turkey.

Athletics

Slovak athletes further achieved the entry standards, either by qualifying time or by world ranking, in the following track and field events (up to a maximum of 3 athletes in each event):

Track & road events
Men

Women

Field events

Badminton

Slovakia entered one badminton player into the Olympic tournament, marking the country's return to the sport for the first time since London 2012. Martina Repiská was automatically selected among the top 40 individual shuttlers in the women's singles based on the BWF World Race to Tokyo Rankings of June 15, 2021.

Boxing

Slovakia entered one male boxer into the Olympic tournament for the first time since Atlanta 1996. Andrej Csemez secured a spot in the men's middleweight division by scoring a quarterfinal victory at the 2020 European Qualification Tournament in Villebon-sur-Yvette, France.

Canoeing

Slalom
Slovak canoeists qualified one boat for each of the following classes through the 2019 ICF Canoe Slalom World Championships in La Seu d'Urgell, Spain and the 2021 European Canoe Slalom Championships in Ivrea, Italy.

Sprint
Slovak canoeists qualified two boats in each of the following distances for the Games through the 2019 ICF Canoe Sprint World Championships in Szeged, Hungary.

Qualification Legend: FA = Qualify to final (medal); FB = Qualify to final B (non-medal)

Cycling

Road
Slovakia entered two riders to compete in the men's Olympic road race, by virtue of their top 50 national finish (for men) in the UCI World Ranking.

Golf

Slovakia entered one golfer for the first time into the Olympic tournament. South African-born Rory Sabbatini (world no. 167) qualified directly among the top 60 eligible players for the men's event based on the IGF World Rankings.

Gymnastics

Artistic
Slovakia entered one artistic gymnast into the Olympic competition. Rio 2016 Olympian Barbora Mokošová booked a spot in the women's individual all-around and apparatus events, by finishing nineteenth out of the twenty gymnasts eligible for qualification at the 2019 World Championships in Stuttgart, Germany.

Women

Shooting

Slovak shooters achieved quota places for the following events by virtue of their best finishes at the 2018 ISSF World Championships, the 2019 ISSF World Cup series, European Championships or Games, and European Qualifying Tournament, as long as they obtained a minimum qualifying score (MQS) by May 31, 2020.

Mixed

Swimming

Slovakia received a universality invitation from FINA to send two top-ranked swimmers (one per gender) in their respective individual events to the Olympics, based on the FINA Points System of June 28, 2021.

Table tennis

Slovakia entered three athletes into the table tennis competition at the Games. Rio 2016 Olympian Wang Yang scored a third-match final triumph to book one of the four available places in the men's singles at the 2021 ITTF World Qualification Tournament in Doha, Qatar.

Tennis

Slovakia entered three tennis players into the Olympic tournament. Norbert Gombos (world no. 89) qualified directly as one of the top 56 eligible players in the men's singles based on the ATP World Rankings of June 13, 2021, with Filip Polášek and Lukáš Klein joining him on the roster to compete in the men's doubles.

Wrestling

For the first time since 2008, Slovakia qualified one wrestler for the men's freestyle 86 kg into the Olympic competition, by progressing to the top two finals at the 2021 World Qualification Tournament in Sofia, Bulgaria.

Freestyle

References

Nations at the 2020 Summer Olympics
2020
2021 in Slovak sport